Coelopus may refer to:
 Coelopus (crab), a fossil genus of crabs in the family Longodromitidae
 Coelopus, a genus of fungi in the family Gyroporaceae, synonym of Gyroporus
 Coelopus, a genus of rotifers in the family Trichocercidae, synonym of Trichocerca